Oliver Bruce Linton is a Professor of Political Economy and Econometrics at Cambridge University and a Fellow of Trinity College. He is a Fellow of the British Academy, a Fellow of the Econometric Society, and a Fellow of the Institute of Mathematical Statistics.

Linton is an Associate Editor with Econometrica, a co-editor at Econometric Theory, and a joint editor of Royal Economic Society (RES) Econometrics Journal.

Notable publications

Chapters in books

Journal articles

Papers 
  Pdf.
  Pdf.
  Pdf.
  Pdf.

References

British development economists
Fellows of the British Academy
Fellows of the Econometric Society
Fellows of Trinity College, Cambridge
Living people
Economics journal editors
Year of birth missing (living people)
Professors of Political Economy (Cambridge, 1863)